Mustafa Şükrü Elekdağ (born 29 September 1924) is a Turkish diplomat, academician, and politician.

He graduated from Galatasaray High School and received his undergraduate from Istanbul Higher Education School of Economics and Commerce, which is the precursor of Marmara University. He earned a postgraduate degree and became Master of Economics from the University of Paris with the help of a scholarship from the French government.

He served as the Undersecretary of the Ministry of Foreign Affairs, the Ambassador of Turkey to Japan (1970–1974), and the United States (1979–1989). He was also the Member of Parliament (2002–2011) from the Republican People's Party.

He was one of the prepotent foreign policymakers of Turkey in the 1990s. In 1994, he wrote the 2½ War Strategy about Turkey's neighborhood relations and national security policy. He was a senior lecturer at Bilkent University between 1990–2002 and gave lectures about strategy, Turkish foreign policy, and security.

Elekdağ has played an important role in Turkey's Armenian genocide denial efforts. In 1982, he claimed that Turkey had not threatened the lives of Jews due to the inclusion of the Armenian genocide in the program of the International Conference on the Holocaust and Genocide in Tel Aviv. This claim was false. Historian Taner Akçam describes Elekdag's policy on the Armenian Genocide as "extreme nationalist and aggressive denial".

References

External links 
Şükrü Elekdağ "Bakış", official website 
Şükrü Elekdağ, Twitter account 
MP profile at the Grand National Assembly website (in Turkish)

1924 births
Living people
Diplomats from Istanbul
Galatasaray High School alumni
Marmara University alumni
University of Paris alumni
Contemporary Republican People's Party (Turkey) politicians
Ambassadors of Turkey to Japan
Ambassadors of Turkey to the United States
Deputies of Istanbul
Members of the 23rd Parliament of Turkey
Members of the 22nd Parliament of Turkey
Turkish expatriates in France